Ellen Guon Beeman is an American fantasy and science fiction author, television screenwriter and computer game designer/producer. She has published four novels and has worked on over 40 video games.

Career in the game industry
Ellen Beeman describes herself as "mom, videogame designer and producer, author, gadget geekette, Celtic fiddler, former TV writer and city commissioner, etc."

In 1989, Beeman left a career in television writing and was hired by Sierra Online as a project manager. She worked as a writer and project manager at Origin Systems for several Wing Commander titles.

In 2006, she was ranked in the top 100 most influential women in the game industry by Edge Online (formerly next-gen.biz). At the time, she was Lead Program Manager at Microsoft Casual Games, a producer role.

Beeman has also been credited at Monolith Productions, Electronic Arts and Disney. She has lectured at many video game industry conferences, including Game Developers Conference, LOGIN, SXSW Interactive, Microsoft Gamefest, PAX and PAX Dev, and Game Design Expo.  She is one of the founders as well as formerly the Program Chair for Women in Games International.

As of 2019, she is an independent video game developer and consultant in Kirkland, Washington, and a Senior Lecturer at DigiPen Institute of Technology.

Television
MoonDreamers (1986)
Jem (1986-1987)
Dinosaucers (1987)

Books
Knight of Ghosts and Shadows (1990) with Mercedes Lackey
Summoned to Tourney (1992) with Mercedes Lackey
Freedom Flight (1992) with Mercedes Lackey
Bedlam Boyz (1993)
Shahrezad and other stories (2011)
The New Professional Programmer's Guide: Code Samples (2020)

Video games
Hoyle's Official Book of Games: Volume 1 (1989) (writer)
Conquests of Camelot: The Search for the Grail (1990) (special thanks)
King's Quest I: Quest for the Crown (1990) (special thanks)
Wing Commander: The Secret Missions (1990) (writer)
Wing Commander: The Secret Missions 2 - Crusade (1991) (writer, director)
Wing Commander II: Vengeance of the Kilrathi (1991) (writer, assistant director)
Wing Commander II: Vengeance of the Kilrathi - Special Operations 1 (1991) (writer)
Wing Commander II: Vengeance of the Kilrathi - Special Operations 2 (1992) (writer, consulting director)
Pickle Wars (1994) (writer)
Might and Magic: Swords of Xeen (1995) (writer)
This Means War! (1995) (project manager)
Contract J.A.C.K. (2003) (producer)
The Matrix Online (2005) (producer)
Hexic 2 (2007) (executive producer)
Dash of Destruction (2008) (executive producer)
South Park Let's Go Tower Defense Play! (2009) (lead producer)
Toy Soldiers (2010) (producer)
Marvel Super Hero Squad Online (2011) (producer)

See also 
 List of women in the video game industry
 Women and video games

References

External links
 Ellen Beeman at MobyGames
 

Year of birth missing (living people)
Living people
20th-century American novelists
American fantasy writers
American science fiction writers
American video game producers
American women novelists
Microsoft employees
Origin Systems people
Sierra On-Line employees
Video game writers
Writers from Kirkland, Washington
Women science fiction and fantasy writers
20th-century American women writers
Novelists from Washington (state)
21st-century American women
Women video game developers